This is a list of airports currently and formerly served by the Portuguese airline Azores Airlines (formerly SATA Internacional) , and separately from the domestic operations of its parent company SATA Air Açores. The list includes destinations operated by charter in addition to regularly scheduled services.

Destinations

See also
 List of SATA Air Açores destinations

References

Lists of airline destinations
Azores-related lists